The Rothschild's zokor (Eospalax rothschildi) is a species of rodent in the family Spalacidae. It is endemic to China.

References
 Smith, A.T. & Johnston, C.H. 2008.  Eospalax rothschildi.   2008 IUCN Red List of Threatened Species.   Downloaded on 14 August 2009.
Musser, G. G. and M. D. Carleton. 2005. Superfamily Muroidea. pp. 894–1531 in Mammal Species of the World a Taxonomic and Geographic Reference. D. E. Wilson and D. M. Reeder eds. Johns Hopkins University Press, Baltimore.

Rodents of China
Eospalax
Mammals described in 1911
Taxonomy articles created by Polbot
Taxa named by Oldfield Thomas
Endemic fauna of China